The  opened in Kitaibaraki, Ibaraki Prefecture, Japan in 1997. It has a memorial room dedicated to Okakura Tenshin and his works and displays other items of Japanese art, especially by the artists of the Izura coast.

See also
 Rokkakudō
 Nihon Bijutsuin

References

External links
Tenshin Memorial Museum of Art 
Tenshin Memorial Museum of Art - homepage 
 

Museums in Ibaraki Prefecture
Art museums and galleries in Japan
Art museums established in 1997
1997 establishments in Japan
Kitaibaraki, Ibaraki